Nikhil Banga Sikhsan Mahavidyalaya is an institution of higher education situated at Bishnupur, Bankura district, in the state of West Bengal, India.

History
The college was established in the month of August, 1969. The institution was approved by the UGC on 31st January 1971 and was considered eligible for central assistance.

Departments and courses
The college offers courses on B.Ed and B.P.Ed.

See also

References

External links
 Nikhil Banga Sikhsan Mahavidyalaya

Colleges affiliated to University of Burdwan
Educational institutions established in 1969
Universities and colleges in Bankura district
1969 establishments in West Bengal